The distinction between terror and horror is a standard literary and psychological concept applied especially to Gothic and horror fiction. Terror is usually described as the feeling of dread and anticipation that precedes the horrifying experience. By contrast, horror is the feeling of revulsion that usually follows a frightening sight, sound, or otherwise experience.

Terror has also been defined by Noel Carroll as a combination of horror and revulsion. as opening a way to go beyond rational social consciousness. Julia Kristeva in turn considered horror as evoking experience of the primitive, the infantile, and the demoniacal aspects of unmediated femininity.

Horror, helplessness and trauma
The paradox of pleasure experienced through horror films/books can be explained partly as stemming from relief from real-life horror in the experience of horror in play, partly as a safe way to return in adult life to the paralysing feelings of infantile helplessness.

Helplessness is also a factor in the overwhelming experience of real horror in psychological trauma. Playing at re-experiencing the trauma may be a helpful way of overcoming it.

See also

References

Bibliography 
Steven Bruhm (1994) Gothic Bodies: The Politics of Pain in Romantic Fiction. Philadelphia: University of Pennsylvania Press.
Gary Crawford (1986) "Criticism" in J. Sullivan (ed) The Penguin Encyclopedia of Horror and the Supernatural.
Ann Radcliffe (1826) "On the Supernatural in Poetry" in The New Monthly Magazine 7, 1826, pp 145–52.
Devendra Varma (1966) The Gothic Flame. New York: Russell and Russell.
Gina Wisker (2005) Horror Fiction: An Introduction. New York: Continuum.
Angela Wright (2007) Gothic Fiction. Basingstoke: Palgrave.
Julian Hanich (2010) Cinematic Emotion in Horror Films and Thrillers. The Aesthetic Paradox of Pleasurable Fear. New York: Routledge.
Noël Carroll (1990) The Philosophy of Horror: Or, Paradoxes of the Heart. New York: Routledge.

Fear
Literary concepts